Kenneth Hazel (born 6 August 1971) is a Trinidadian cricketer. He played in 3 first-class and 32 List A matches for Trinidad and Tobago from 1993 to 2001.

See also
 List of Trinidadian representative cricketers

References

External links
 

1971 births
Living people
Trinidad and Tobago cricketers